Łukasz Owsian (born 24 February 1990) is a Polish professional racing cyclist, who currently rides for UCI ProTeam . He was named in the start list for the 2017 Giro d'Italia.

Major results

2008
 1st Stage 4 Course de la Paix Juniors
2011
 2nd Road race, National Under-23 Road Championships
2012
 3rd Overall Carpathia Couriers Path
2013
 2nd Overall Dookoła Mazowsza
 4th Memoriał Henryka Łasaka
2014
 1st Stage 3a (TTT) Sibiu Cycling Tour
 1st  Mountains classification, Szlakiem Grodów Piastowskich
2015
 2nd Memorial Grundmanna I Wizowskiego
 3rd Coupe des Carpathes
2016
 1st GP Polski
 2nd Korona Kocich Gór
 7th Overall Szlakiem Grodów Piastowskich
 7th Overall Tour of Małopolska
2017
 1st Korona Kocich Gór
 1st  Mountains classification, Tour of Britain
 5th Overall Tour of Małopolska
 6th Overall Szlakiem Walk Majora Hubala
 8th Overall Czech Cycling Tour
2018
 1st  Overall Szlakiem Grodów Piastowskich
1st  Points classification
1st Stage 3
 1st Memorial Grundmanna I Wizowskiego
 2nd Overall Tour de Langkawi
 3rd Road race, National Road Championships
 10th Overall Okolo Slovenska
2021
 1st  Mountains classification, Tour de Pologne
 3rd Road race, National Road Championships
2022
 3rd Road race, National Road Championships
 8th Trofeo Calvià

Grand Tour general classification results timeline

References

External links
 

1990 births
Living people
Polish male cyclists
Sportspeople from Toruń
21st-century Polish people